The Aetna Springs Resort is a historic resort located in Pope Valley in the north eastern part of Napa County, California, United States. It is listed on the National Register of Historic Places.

Etymology
It was named after a nearby hot spring.  The spring was so named by the owner of the Aetna Mines, John Lawley, when he discovered the spring in the 1880s.

History
Aetna springs was founded by Chancellor Hartson in 1877.  

The resort and spa originally developed by San Francisco advertising executive Len D. Owens who began development of the resort in 1891 after he purchased the property for $35,000. Owens was Frances Marion's father. In n the 1870s and quickly became a popular summertime destination for vacationers from San Francisco and Hollywood. One of the first golf courses west of the Mississippi River was built on the resort's property in 1891.  George Heibel, bought the resort from Owens in 1945.  In 1966 Ronald Reagan announced his intention to run for the office of Governor of California in the dining hall at the resort. Heibel sold the resort to Environmental Systems in 1972.  The resort again sold in 1976 to New Educational Development Systems, a nonprofit corporation associated with the Unification Church.

On June 9, 2009 it was announced that the Aetna Springs Resort would close. Snell Valley lies to the north of Aetna Springs.  In early 2012 the Napa County Planning Commission approved plans to renovate existing 28 structures and build a new lodge on the property. The resort property was sold to Alchemy Resorts in 2018. In 2023, it was announced that the resort will be restored as Six Senses Napa Valley, with a reopening set for 2026.

In literature
Aetna Springs is the locale of Frances Marion's Valley People, a book of short stories published in 1935.

See also
 Snell Creek

References

National Register of Historic Places in Napa County, California
Vaca Mountains
Tourist attractions in Napa County, California